Camberwell Junction is a major intersection in Melbourne, Australia.  It is at the intersection of Burke, Riversdale and Camberwell Roads. Trams that pass through the junction are the 70, 72 and 75. The Junction is approximately 500 metres south of Camberwell railway station on the Belgrave, Lilydale and Alamein lines.

The Junction is adjacent to Camberwell shopping centre, focussed mainly on Burke Road. The nearby Camberwell Market features speciality delicatessens and fruit and vegetables. The Rivoli cinemas in Riversdale Road comprise an Art Deco design and show mainstream and arthouse films.

References

External links
 The Camberwell Traders' Association website

See also

Streets in Melbourne
Road junctions in Australia
Transport in the City of Boroondara